Bradley Christopher Jones (born May 20, 1963, in New York City) is an American jazz bassist who performs on both bass guitar and double-bass.

Jones started on drums as a child and first began playing bass guitar at age 12. At age 18 he added double bass, studying under Lisle Atkinson, and he took a bachelor's degree in music education at Jersey City State College in 1986. In the late 1980s he worked regularly with Dave Tronzo and Jim Nolet, and played in the Jazz Passengers and in groups led by Marc Ribot.

In the 1990s he worked with Muhal Richard Abrams, Elvin Jones, Ornette Coleman, Carlos Garnett, Mark Taylor, Kazutoki Umezu, Misha Mengelberg, and Han Bennink.

He has led the groups AKA Alias featuring Curtis Fowlkes and David Gilmore, the Brad Jones Quartet with Greg Tardy and more recently Avant Lounge with Bruce Williams, Barney McAll, Bill Ware and Nate Smith.

Discography
Uncivilized Poise (Knitting Factory Works, 1999) with AKA Alias
Pouring My Heart In (Brad Jones Quartet, 2003) with the Brad Jones Quartet
The Embodiment (Senoj, 2009) with AKA Alias
Avant Lounge (Ropeadope, 2012) with Avant Lounge

As sideman

With Muhal Richard Abrams
Blu Blu Blu (Black Saint, 1991)
Family Talk (Black Saint, 1993)
Think All, Focus One (Black Saint, 1995)
Song for All (Black Saint, 1995 [1997])
with Ray Anderson and Marty Ehrlich
Hear You Say (Intuition, 2010)
With Noël Akchoté
Toi-Même (Winter & Winter, 2008)
With Lucian Ban
Playground (Jazzaway, 2006)
With Don Byron
Do the Boomerang: The Music of Junior Walker (Blue Note, 2006)
Love, Peace, and Soul (Savoy, 2011)
With George Cartwright
Dot (Cuneiform, 1994)
With Ornette Coleman
Tone Dialing (Harmolodic, 1995)
With Elvis Costello
North (Deutsche Grammophon, 2003)
With Dave Douglas
Freak In (RCA Bluebird, 2003)
Keystone (Greenleaf, 2005)
Moonshine (Greenleaf, 2007)
Spark of Being (Greenleaf, 2010)
With Francis Dunnery
Tall Blonde Helicopter (Atlantic, 1995)
With Carlos Garnett
Resurgence (Muse, 1996)
Fuego en Mi Alma (HighNote, 1997)
Under Nubian Skies (HighNote, 1999)
With The Jazz Passengers
Broken Night Red Light (Les Disques du Crépuscule, 1987)
Deranged & Decomposed (Les Disques du Crépuscule, 1988)
Implement Yourself (New World, 1990)
Live at the Knitting Factory (Knitting Factory, 1990)
Plain Old Joe (Knitting Factory Works, 1993)
In Love (High Street, 1994)
Individually Twisted (32 Jazz, 1996)
"Live" in Spain (32 Jazz, 1998)
Reunited (Justin Time, 2010)
Still Life with Trouble (Enja, 2017)
With Elvin Jones
Going Home (Enja, 1992)
With Sean Lennon
Into the Sun (Grand Royal, 1998)
With Dave Liebman
Surreality (Enja, 2012)
With David Mead
Indiana (Nettwork, 2004)
With Misha Mengelberg
Who's Bridge (Avant, 1994)	
Four in One (Songlines, 2001)		
With Allison Moorer
Down to Believing (eOne, 2016)
With Max Nagl
Big Four (HatOLOGY, 2002) with Steven Bernstein and Noël Akchoté
Flamingos (HatOLOGY, 2004) with Otto Lechner
Big Four Live (HatOLOGY, 2007) with Steven Bernstein and Noël Akchoté
Big Four/Sortilèges (Extraplatte, 2010) with Steven Bernstein and Noël Akchoté
With Roy Nathanson
Camp Stories: Music from the Motion Picture (Knitting Factory Works, 1996)	
Fire at Keaton's Bar and Grill (Six Degrees, 2000)	
Subway Moon (Yellowbird, 2009)
With Jim Nolet
With You (Knitting Factory Works, 1993)
With Bobby Previte
Set the Alarm for Monday (Palmetto, 2008)
With Chuck Prophet
Bobby Fuller Died for Your Sins (Yep Roc, 2017)
With Marc Ribot
Requiem for What's His Name (Les Disques du Crépuscule, 1992)
 Shoe String Symphonettes (Tzadik, 1997)
 The Prosthetic Cubans (Atlantic, 1998)
¡Muy Divertido! (Atlantic, 2000)
With Roswell Rudd
Keep Your Heart Right (Sunnyside, 2008)
With Jamie Saft
Chaliwa (Veal, 2013) as New Zion Trio
Sunshine Seas (RareNoise, 2016) as New Zion with Cyro Baptista
Blue Dream (RareNoise, 2018)
Hidden Corners (RareNoise, 2019)
With Elliott Sharp
Aggregat (Clean Feed, 2012)
Quintet (Clean Feed, 2013)
Dialectrical (Clean Feed, 2016)
With Vibes: Bill Ware and E.J. Rodriguez
Vibes (Knitting Factory, 1998) 
With Drawn (Knitting Factory, 1999) 
Liebe Tunina (Knitting Factory, 2000) 
Vibes 4 (Knitting Factory, 2001)
With Bill Ware
Long and Skinny (Knitting Factory Works, 1993)
Played Right (Cheetah, 2009)
With John Zorn
John Zorn's Cobra: Live at the Knitting Factory (Knitting Factory Works, 1995)
Voices in the Wilderness (Tzadik, 2003)

References

Gary W. Kennedy, "Brad Jones". The New Grove Dictionary of Jazz. 2nd edition, ed. Barry Kernfeld.

American jazz double-bassists
Male double-bassists
American jazz bass guitarists
American male bass guitarists
Musicians from New York City
1963 births
Living people
20th-century American bass guitarists
Jazz musicians from New York (state)
21st-century double-bassists
20th-century American male musicians
21st-century American male musicians
American male jazz musicians